Attila Haris (born 23 January 1997) is a Hungarian football player who plays for Paks.

Career
On 24 May 2015, Haris played his first profession match for Ferencváros TC in a 1–0 win against Budapest Honvéd in the Hungarian League. On 1 February 2016, Haris was loaned to Soroksár SC. He played for them until Ferencváros TC gave him to Balmazújvárosi FC on 30 June 2017.

On 6 January 2023, Haris signed a three-and-a-half-year contract with Paks.

Club statistics

Updated to games played as of 27 June 2020.

References

External links
 Profile at HLSZ 
 

1997 births
People from Szolnok
Sportspeople from Jász-Nagykun-Szolnok County
21st-century Hungarian people
Living people
Hungarian footballers
Hungary youth international footballers
Hungary under-21 international footballers
Association football midfielders
Ferencvárosi TC footballers
Soroksári TE footballers
Balmazújvárosi FC players
Debreceni VSC players
Paksi FC players
Nemzeti Bajnokság I players
Nemzeti Bajnokság II players